Matthew James Thistlethwaite (born 6 September 1972) is an Australian politician. He has been an Australian Labor Party member of the Australian House of Representatives since 2013, representing the electorate of Kingsford Smith. He was formerly a member of the Australian Senate from 2011 to 2013. Since 1 June 2022, Thistlethwaite has served as Assistant Minister for Defence, Veterans' Affairs and the Republic in the ministry of Anthony Albanese. 

He previously served as Parliamentary Secretary for Pacific Island Affairs and Parliamentary Secretary for Multicultural Affairs in the Gillard government from March to July 2013, and as Parliamentary Secretary for Infrastructure and Transport in the Rudd government from July to September 2013. Before joining Parliament, he was the general secretary of the New South Wales branch of the Australian Labor Party.

Early life
Thistlethwaite was born in Sydney on 6 September 1972. He grew up in the suburb of Maroubra. He graduated from the University of New South Wales with a Bachelor of Economics, and also holds diplomas in law and legal practice from the University of Technology, Sydney. He was the first member of his family to attend university.

Career
In 1995 Thistlethwaite began working at the Australian Workers Union as an industrial officer. In 2001 he was elected as a state vice-president of the union. He joined the ALP at the age of 22 and was president of NSW Young Labor from 1997 to 1998.

In 2004 Thistlethwaite was elected deputy assistant secretary of Unions NSW. In this role he represented workers in public sector enterprise agreement negotiations and in the NSW Industrial Relations Commission.  He was a co-ordinator of the Your Rights at Work campaign in New South Wales against the Howard Government's WorkChoices laws. Thistlethwaite is a former director of the State Transit Authority of NSW and the NSW Manufacturing Council. He was a member of the Racing Industry Participants Advisory Council, and an executive member of the NSW Jockeys Association. He was elected general secretary of NSW Labor from 2008 to 2010. During his time as NSW ALP secretary Thistlethwaite backed Frank Sartor's unsuccessful candidacy to replace premier Nathan Rees and Rees was instead replaced by Kristina Keneally.
Before entering Parliament, Thistlethwaite worked as a senior consultant with law firm Mallesons Stephen Jaques.

Political career

Thistlethwaite sought to become the endorsed Labor candidate for the House of Representatives seat of Kingsford Smith in Sydney's eastern suburbs, for the 2004 election.  However, Peter Garrett was chosen by the then Labor leader Mark Latham.

He was endorsed for a seat in the Senate, representing New South Wales, at the 2010 election. He was successful, and his term began on 1 July 2011. On 18 July 2011 he gave his first speech in the Senate. Soon after his term began, Thistlethwaite was appointed to serve on five Parliamentary Committees. In August 2012, Thistlethwaite became Chair of the Senate Select Committee on Electricity Prices.

Following the announcement by Peter Garrett that he would not recontest the seat of Kingsford Smith at the next federal election, Thistlethwaite announced on 2 July 2013 that he would again seek Labor preselection; and gained endorsement on 20 July 2013, defeating Tony Bowen, the mayor of Randwick and son of former Kingsford Smith MP Lionel Bowen.

Thistlethwaite was elected as the member for Kingsford-Smith at the election held on 7 September 2013. Thistlethwaite was one of three people to have moved from the Senate to the House of Representatives at this election (the others were his ALP colleague David Feeney in Batman and former Nationals Senate leader Barnaby Joyce in New England).

In 2017 the Australian Labor Party announced a national vote on the republic during the first term of a future Labor government, and appointed Matt Thistlethwaite as the first 'Shadow Assistant Minister for an Australian Head of State'.

Thistlethwaite is a senior figure in the Labor Right faction and stands as the current convenor of the NSW branch.  In 2020, he was elected to replace Joel Fitzgibbon as the convenor within the ALP. The Australian reported that "by becoming the NSW factional boss, Thistlethwaite de facto takes the title of national Right convener". 

In 2022 he was appointed Assistant Minister for Defence, Assistant Minister for Veterans' Affairs, and Assistant Minister for the Republic in the Albanese ministry.

Personal life
Thistlethwaite served as the president of the Maroubra Surf Life Saving Club for four years.

References

External links

 

|-

|-

|-

|-

|-

|-

1972 births
Living people
Australian Labor Party members of the Parliament of Australia
Labor Right politicians
Members of the Australian House of Representatives for Kingsford Smith
Members of the Australian House of Representatives
Members of the Australian Senate
Members of the Australian Senate for New South Wales
Politicians from Sydney
Australian solicitors
Australian trade unionists
21st-century Australian politicians
Australian Labor Party officials
Australian republicans